The Human Rights Award (Sarajevo Film Festival) is an award given at the Sarajevo Film Festival. The award is given for the best film from the competition documentary program dealing with the subject of human rights. It was first awarded in 2004, at the 10th edition of festival, and has since become a traditional award. The Human Rights Award is provided by the Swiss Federal Department of Foreign Affairs.

Award winners

References

External links
Sarajevo Film Festival - Official Website
IMDb: Sarajevo Film Festival - SFF at IMDb 

Lists of films by award
Sarajevo Film Festival
Bosnia and Herzegovina film awards